Northwest Trek Wildlife Park is a  wildlife park located near the town of Eatonville, Washington, United States. The park is home to black and grizzly bears, grey wolves, bald eagles, a cougar, wolverines, bobcats and more. Its primary feature is a tram tour which takes visitors through a  free-roam area. The park also allows guests to drive their own vehicles past bison, mountain goats, Roosevelt elk, deer, caribou, swans and more on a Wild Drive tour. Guests can also take a premier Keeper Adventure Tour and go off-road in a Jeep with a keeper and up close to wildlife. The Zip Wild zipline is also open seasonally. 

Northwest Trek Wildlife Park is accredited by the Association of Zoos and Aquariums (AZA). The park and its companion zoo, Point Defiance Zoo & Aquarium in Tacoma, are both owned and operated by Metro Parks Tacoma.

History
In 1971, founders David and Connie Hellyer donated their vacation property near Eatonville to Metro Parks Tacoma to be set aside as a wildlife preserve. The park opened in 1975. Several bond issues have been passed over the years to help pay for improvements at the park. Facilities added over the years include the Snowy Owl Exhibit (1982), Great Horned Owl Exhibit (1985), Cat Country Exhibit (1987), Barn Owl Exhibit (1988), the Cheney Discovery Center for children (1989), Wolf Exhibit (1992), Grizzly and Black Bear Exhibit (1993), Picnic Pavilion (1995), and the Coyote/Red Fox Exhibit (2003).

In 2000, voters passed a sales tax increase that provides a steady income for the Point Defiance Zoo, Trek and other Pierce County parks and supplies about half of the park's income. The park also opened the Hellyer Natural History Center, a laboratory/classroom that can be used by students, scientists, and others in the community.

In 2005, an additional 100 acres along the northern border of the park was purchased to help protect the tram route from residential development and provide additional space for research and conservation programs.

Features
The park is divided into three areas: the Tram Tour area, the Walking Tour area, and the Nature Trails area.

Free-Roaming Area Tours

The Free-Roaming Area is the park's main feature. Visitors can take a self-drive Wild Drive tour or hop in the Keeper Adventure Tour Jeep through the  free-range area. Animals that can be seen include: moose, mountain goat, Roosevelt elk, American bison, caribou, white-tailed deer, bighorn sheep, and trumpeter swan

Walking paths
The walking path area is where visitors can see animals in enclosed spaces much like at a conventional zoo. The area has two "learning centers" featuring hands-on activities for children, as well as services for visitors including a cafeteria and a gift shop.  Bordering the tour pathway, one can see and enjoy a great variety of native plant life, some of which is labeled for easy identification.

Animal species that can be seen on the walking tour include: the western toad, gopher snake, banana slug, rough-skinned newt, bald eagle, golden eagle, snowy owl, barn owl, turkey vulture, bobcat, lynx, cougar, coyote, red fox, grey wolf, grizzly bear, black bear, fisher, badger, skunk, porcupine, wolverine, raccoon, river otter, and beaver.

Nature trails
Northwest Trek has five miles of nature trails that visitors can walk.

Learning centers
The walking tour has two learning centers: the Cheney Family Discovery Center and the Baker Research Cabin. Both feature animals and hands-on activities for children.

Cheney Family Discovery Center
Cheney Family Discovery Center is located close to the tram boarding station. At the Cheney Family Discovery Center visitors can touch several fur pelts of Pacific Northwest animals, participate in children's crafts, and view several animals.

Animal species that can be seen in Cheney Family Discovery Center include rough-skinned newt, western toad and gopher snakes.

Baker Research Cabin
The Baker Research Cabin is located in between the gray wolves and the red foxes. In Baker Research Cabin visitors can see wolves and view coyotes and red foxes by remotely controlled cameras.

See also
Point Defiance Zoo & Aquarium
Woodland Park Zoo

References

External links

Parks in Pierce County, Washington
Zoos in Washington (state)
Tourist attractions in Pierce County, Washington
Buildings and structures in Pierce County, Washington
Zoos established in 1975